Ronald Stewart Moore (December 22, 1913 – November 21, 2003) was a Canadian politician from Manitoba. He served as a Co-operative Commonwealth Federation MP in the House of Commons of Canada from 1945 to 1949 representing the riding of Churchill.

Moore was born in Foam Lake, Saskatchewan and worked on the Canadian National Railway as a young man. During World War II he enlisted with the Royal Canadian Navy and served from 1942 to 1945. He was elected to parliament after the war in the 1945 federal election.

After losing the 1949 federal election he returned to the CNR in Brandon, Manitoba before qualifying as an engineer and getting a job at CFB Shilo's heating plant.  He remained active with the CCF and its successor, the New Democratic Party throughout his life. Moore attempted to regain his seat in the 1953 federal election but was unsuccessful. He died in 2003 in Brandon.

References

External links 
 

1913 births
2003 deaths
Co-operative Commonwealth Federation MPs
20th-century Canadian politicians
Members of the House of Commons of Canada from Manitoba